Kuda, formerly Full Nagarjan, is a village located in the Dimapur District of Nagaland, India. As of 2011 census, Kuda had a total population of 16,108 inhabitants.

History 
Kuda was established in 1941. It was previously known as 'Full Nagarjan' but a resolution on 14 May 1999 by the Kuda Village Council officially changed the name to its present name.

Geography 
Kuda is bounded by Dimapur to the north, Dhansiri River to the east, Toulazouma to the south and Thahekhu and Signal Angami Village to the west.

References 

Dimapur district
Villages in Nagaland